Aslin is an English surname, from the Norman name Asceline.  Åslin is an unrelated Swedish locational surname, from ås "ridge". 
Notable people with the surnames include:

Charles Herbert Aslin (1893–1959), British architect;
Elizabeth Mary Aslin (1923–1989), English art historian, administrator, author and lecturer;
Richard N. Aslin (born 1949), American psychologist;
Peter Åslin (1962–2012), Swedish ice hockey goaltender;
David Åslin (born 1989), Swedish ice hockey player;
Aiden Aslin (born 1994), a British foreign volunteer.